Vulvodynia is a chronic pain syndrome that affects the vulvar area and occurs without an identifiable cause. Symptoms typically include a feeling of burning or irritation. It has been established by the ISSVD that for the diagnosis to be made symptoms must last at least three months.

The exact cause is unknown but is believed to involve a number of factors, including genetics, immunology, and possibly diet. Diagnosis is by ruling out other possible causes. This may or may not include a biopsy of the area.

Treatment may involve a number of different measures; however, none is universally effective, and the evidence to support their effectiveness is often poor. Some of these measures include improved vulvar care, dietary changes, medications, counselling, and, if conservative treatment is not effective, surgery. It is estimated to affect up to 16% of women.

Signs and symptoms
Pain is the most notable symptom of vulvodynia, and can be characterized as a burning, stinging, irritation or sharp pain that occurs in the vulva and entrance to the vagina. It may be constant, intermittent or happen only when the vulva is touched, but vulvodynia usually has a long duration.

Symptoms may occur in one place or the entire vulvar area. It can occur during or after sexual activity, when tampons are inserted, or when prolonged pressure is applied to the vulva, such as during sitting, bike riding, or horseback riding. Some cases of vulvodynia are idiopathic where no particular cause can be determined.

Vulvar vestibulitis

Vulvar vestibulitis syndrome (VVS), vestibulodynia, or simply vulvar vestibulitis or "localized (to the vestibule) provoked vulvodynia" refers to pain localized to the vestibular region. It tends to be associated with a highly localized "burning" or "cutting" type of pain. The pain of vulvodynia may extend into the clitoris; this is referred to as clitorodynia.

Vulvar vestibulitis syndrome is the most common subtype of vulvodynia that affects premenopausal women – the syndrome has been cited as affecting about 10%–15% of women seeking gynecological care.

Causes
A wide variety of possible causes and treatments for vulvodynia are currently being explored. Moreover, there are probably several causes of vulvodynia, and some may be individual to the patient.

Possible causes include Sjögren syndrome, the symptoms of which include chronic vaginal dryness. Others include genetic predisposition to inflammation, allergy or other sensitivity (for example: oxalates in the urine), an autoimmune disorder similar to lupus erythematosus or to eczema or to lichen sclerosus, infection (e.g., yeast infections, bacterial vaginosis, HPV, HSV), injury, and neuropathy—including an increased number of nerve endings in the vaginal area. Some cases seem to be negative outcomes of genital surgery, such as a labioplasty.  Initiation of hormonal contraceptives that contain low- dose estrogen before the age of 16 could predispose women to vulvar vestibulitis syndrome. A significantly lower pain threshold, especially in the posterior vestibulum, has also been associated with the use of hormonal contraceptives in women without vulvar vestibulitis syndrome. Pelvic floor dysfunction may be the underlying cause of some women's pain.

Diagnosis
The condition is one of exclusion and other vulvovaginal problems should be ruled out. The diagnosis is based on the typical complaints of the patient, essentially normal physical findings, and the absence of identifiable causes per the differential diagnosis. Cotton swab testing is used to differentiate between generalized and localized pain and delineate the areas of pain and categorize their severity. Patients often will describe the touch of a cotton ball as extremely painful, like the scraping of a knife. A diagram of pain locations may be helpful in assessing the pain over time. The vagina should be examined, and tests, including wet mount, vaginal pH, fungal culture, and Gram stain, should be performed as indicated. Fungal culture may identify resistant strains.

It is estimated that only half of affected women will seek medical help, among whom many will see several doctors before a correct diagnosis is made. Only 2% of the people that seek help do obtain a diagnostic. Many gynecologists are not familiar with this family of conditions, but awareness has spread with time. Affected women are also often hesitant to seek treatment for chronic vulvar pain, especially since many women begin experiencing symptoms around the same time they become sexually active. Moreover, the absence of any visible symptoms means that before being successfully diagnosed many patients have been told that the pain is "in their head" (a medical stance more associated with the 1970s than with modern medicine).

Differential diagnosis
 Infections: urinary tract infection, candidiasis, herpes, HPV
 Inflammation: lichen planus
 Neoplasm: Paget's disease, vulvar carcinoma
 Neurologic disorder: neuralgia secondary to herpes virus, spinal nerve injury

Treatment
There are a number of possible treatments with none being uniformly effective. Treatments include:

Lifestyle
A number of lifestyle changes are often recommended such as using cotton underwear, not using substances that may irritate the area, and using lubricant during sex. The use of alternative medicine has not been sufficiently studied to make recommendations.

Counseling
 Education and accurate information about vestibulodynia: Gynaecologist-led educational seminars delivered in a group format have a significant positive impact on psychological symptoms and sexual functioning in women who have provoked (caused by a stimulus such as touch or sexual activity) vestibulodynia. Provoked vestibulodynia, whilst similar in some respects, is different to vulvodynia which this article refers to.
 Biofeedback, physical therapy and relaxation: Biofeedback, often done by physical therapists, involves inserting a vaginal sensor to get a sense of the strength of the muscles and help a patient get greater control of her muscles to feel the difference between contraction and relaxation. Sessions are linked with at-home recommendations including often Kegel exercises (e.g., hold for 9 seconds, relax for 30 seconds, for 10–15 sets), and relaxation.

Medications
A number of medications have been used to treat vulvodynia. Evidence to support their use, however, is often poor. These include creams and ointments containing lidocaine, estrogen or tricyclic antidepressants. Antidepressants and anticonvulsants in pill form are sometimes tried but have been poorly studied. Injectable medications included steroids and botulinum toxin have been tried with limited success.

Surgery
Vestibulectomy, during which the nerve fibers to the area are cut out, may be recommended if other treatments have not been found to be effective. There have been no high quality studies looking at surgery as a treatment. While improvement has been noted in 60% to 90%, those who were treated without surgery improved in 40 to 80% of cases.

Epidemiology
The percentage of women affected is not entirely clear, but estimates range as high as 16%. Many other conditions that are not truly vulvodynia (diagnosis is made by ruling out other causes of vulvar pain) could be confused with it. Vulvar pain is a quite frequent complaint in women's health clinics. Vulvodynia is a new term in the medical literature.

References

External links 
 

Chronic pain syndromes
Gynaecologic disorders
Neurocutaneous conditions
Pain